Treloar School and College is a non-maintained residential and day special school and college for disabled children and young people aged from 2 to 25 in Holybourne near Alton, Hampshire, UK.

Aims and governance
The school and college aims to provide enabling education to the disabled, using a combination of  teaching, care, occupational therapy, physiotherapy, and speech and language therapy. They are administered by Treloar Trust, a registered charity. The school, college, and trust are often referred to singly or collectively as "Treloar's", and indeed the official motto is "Treloar's: Enabling Education".

History
In 1907, the then Lord Mayor of the City of London, Sir William Purdie Treloar, set up a 'Cripples' Fund' as his mayoral appeal. His aim was to build a hospital and school outside the city for children with non-pulmonary tuberculosis. On 13 June that year he wrote in his diary that Her Majesty Queen Alexandra 'came to Mansion House to open the Queen's Fete in aid of my Cripples' Fund'. In 1908, the boarding school and hospital were opened in Alton, as The Lord Mayor Treloar Cripples' Hospital and College. In 1948 the National Health Service took over the hospital, and the Lord Mayor Treloar College subsequently moved from Alton to a new site bought by the Trust in 1949 in the nearby village of Froyle. In 1965 the Florence Treloar School for Girls was opened in the village of Holybourne; the two schools were combined in 1978 under the Lord Mayor Treloar College name, with the Lower School housed at Froyle and the Upper School at Holybourne.

During the 1970s and 1980s, the boys' school offered specialist care for haemophiliacs. With the introduction of Factor VIII treatment, between 1974 and 1987 many were injected with Factor VIII imported from the United States and manufactured from contaminated non-heat-treated blood plasma, and were infected with HIV and hepatitis; 90 out of 122 have since died. A public inquiry into the National Health Service's use of contaminated blood products began taking evidence from those affected in 2019, and in 2021 heard statements from former Treloar's pupils who were infected there. In 2022, a lawsuit against the school was filed by survivors.

In 1995 the Holybourne campus became the Lord Mayor Treloar National Specialist College of Further Education; in 2000 this was shortened to Treloar College and the Froyle campus became Treloar School. After the launching of an appeal, Vision Treloar's, in 2010, the School, College, and Trust were consolidated on a new campus on the Holybourne site that was officially opened in 2012 by Sophie, Countess of Wessex, who is the Trust's Royal Patron.

In 2004, the College became the first specialist college to be awarded 'outstanding' for the quality of its provision, leadership and management by Ofsted, and in 2017 it was awarded 'Beacon College' status by the Department for Education and Science. The school received an 'inadequate' Ofsted assessment in 2011, but was rated 'outstanding' in 2016 and 2018.

Headteachers and Principals
Headteachers have included :
1953 - 1972: George Heywood
1972 - 1974: Johnston Smith
1974 - 1990: Alec Macpherson
1990-1997: Hartley Heard
1996 - 2006: Neil Clark
2006 - 2007: Heather Boardman
2007 - 2011: Harry Dicks
2011 - 2014: Melissa Farnham
2018–: Mia Dodsworth
College Principals have included:

1994 - 1995: Dr Jane Lones
1995 - 2006: Dr Graham Jowett
2006 - 2008: Pat Teague
2014 - 2016: John Stone (Principal), School and College - Jo McSherrie
2016 - current: Martin Ingram

Sport
Treloar School has built a reputation of developing the sporting abilities of young people with physical disabilities. Many students continue their sporting progress at Treloar College and beyond. Particular strengths are in athletics, with many students showing Paralympic potential, boccia, and swimming. Many former students represented Great Britain at the 2012 Paralympics in London. A sports facility accommodating basketball, chair football, hockey, and tennis was opened in 2014.

Notable alumni 
Ash Atalla, TV producer
Spike Breakwell, comedian, writer, actor and musician
Laurence Clark (comedian), disability rights broadcaster
Paul Darke, academic, artist and disability rights activist
Julie Fernandez, actress and disability rights campaigner
Ben Rushgrove, Paralympic track athlete
Rosaleen Moriarty-Simmonds, artist

References

External links
 http://www.treloar.org.uk

Private schools in Hampshire
Special schools in Hampshire
Educational institutions established in 1908
1908 establishments in England